Hermansson is a surname. Notable people with the surname include:

Alexander Hermansson (ice hockey) (born 1988), professional Swedish ice hockey goaltender
Alexander Hermansson (entertainer), (born 1992), Swedish YouTube and television presenter
Andreas Hermansson (born 1973), Swedish football player
Ann-Sofie Hermansson (born 1964), Swedish politician of the Social Democrats
Bo Hermansson (born 1937), Swedish film director and screenwriter
C.-H. Hermansson (1917–2016), former Swedish politician
Daniel Hermansson (born 1982), Swedish professional ice hockey player
Fredrik Hermansson (born 1976), Swedish musician
Hanna Hermansson (born 1989), Swedish runner
Herbert Hermansson (1906–1984), Swedish politician
Jack Hermansson (born 1988), Swedish professional mixed martial artist
Jan Hermansson (born 1942), one of the first aikido pioneers in Sweden
Kakan Hermansson (born 1981), Swedish television presenter, radio host, comedian and artist
Kevin Hermansson (born 1990), Swedish rower and part of the Swedish rowing team
Michaela Hermansson (born 1990), Swedish footballer midfielder
Terry Hermansson, former New Zealand rugby league player
Mia Hermansson-Högdahl (born 1965), Swedish team handball player
Jens Hermansson Juel or Jens Juel (born 1580), Danish nobleman, Governor-general of Norway 1618–1629

See also
Hermannsson
Hermansen
Hermanson

Swedish-language surnames